Mazinghem is a commune in the Pas-de-Calais department in the Hauts-de-France region of France.

Geography

Population

Places of interest
 The church of Notre-Dame-de-l'Annonciation, dating from the twelfth century.
 Some remains of a medieval chateau.
 The eighteenth-century chateau.

See also
Communes of the Pas-de-Calais department

References

Communes of Pas-de-Calais